Hades Terrace is a steep, mainly ice-covered bluff along the east side of Campbell Glacier, situated just west of the Vulcan Hills in the Southern Cross Mountains of Victoria Land, Antarctica. It was named by the northern party of the New Zealand Geological Survey Antarctic Expedition, 1965–66, presumably from Greek mythology.

References

Cliffs of Victoria Land
Borchgrevink Coast